Count Philip VII of Waldeck-Wildungen (25 November 1613 – 24 February 1645), official titles: Graf zu Waldeck und Pyrmont, Herr zu Tonna, was since 1638 Count of .

Biography
Philip was born at Eisenberg Castle on 25 November 1613 as the second son of Count Christian of Waldeck-Wildungen and his wife Countess Elisabeth of Nassau-Siegen. The County of Waldeck-Wildungen, like the entire County of Waldeck, was heavily in debt. The lordship was sold to Duke Frederick I of Saxe-Gotha-Altenburg in 1677.

An important and, as it turned out, fatal event during Philip’s reign was the time when Swedish troops were encamped in Wildungen. The commander-in-chief, Johan Banér, had marched to the city in August 1640 with about 70,000 men, while not far from there the imperial troops under Archduke Leopold William and Ottavio Piccolomini were encamped in Fritzlar. No battle took place. But the soldiers used the city’s supplies and destroyed the villages in the surrounding countryside. On 15 September Banér marched away again.

Annoyed beyond measure by the damage the Swedes had inflicted on his county, Philip changed sides and took the side of Emperor Ferdinand III in 1643. The Emperor appointed him a colonel and put him in charge of a cavalry regiment called ‘Waldeck’.

On 24 February 1645, at the Battle of Jankov in Bohemia, where the Bavarian and imperial troops were defeated by the Swedish general Lennart Torstenson, the 31-year-old Philip was taken prisoner and – against the law of war – executed. Philip was succeeded by his eldest son Christian Louis, who was under the regency of his mother until 1660.

Marriage and issue
Philip married in Frankfurt on 26 October 1634 to Countess Anne Catherine of Sayn-Wittgenstein (Simmern, 27 July 1610 – , December 1690), daughter of Count  and Countess Elisabeth Juliane of Solms-Braunfels. From this marriage the following children worn born:
 Count Christian Louis (Waldeck, 29 July 1635 – , 12 December 1706), succeeded his father as Count of Waldeck-Wildungen in 1645. Married:
 on 2 July 1658 to Countess Anne Elisabeth of Rappoltstein (Rappoltstein, 7 March 1644 – Landau, 6 December 1678).
 in Idstein on 6 June 1680Jul. to Countess Johannette of Nassau-Idstein (Idstein, 14 September 1657 – Landau, 14 March 1733).
 Count Josias II (Wildungen, 31 July 1636Jul. – Kandia, 8 August 1669Greg.), obtained the Wildungen district as an appanage in 1660. He married at Arolsen Castle on 26 January 1660 to Countess Wilhelmine Christine of Nassau-Siegen (1629 – Hildburghausen, 22 January 1700).
  (1 August 1637 – , 20 May 1707), married at Arolsen Castle on 27 January 1660 to Count Henry Wolrad of Waldeck-Eisenberg (Culemborg, 28 March 1642 – Graz, 15 July 1664).
 Anne Sophie (Waldeck, 1 January 1639 – 3 October 1646).
 Joanne (Waldeck, 30 September 1639 – Waldeck, 2 October 1639).
 Philippine (19 November 1643 – 3 August 1644).

Ancestors

Notes

References

Sources
 
 
 
 
 
 
 
 
  (1882). Het vorstenhuis Oranje-Nassau. Van de vroegste tijden tot heden (in Dutch). Leiden: A.W. Sijthoff/Utrecht: J.L. Beijers.

External links
 Descendants of Wolrad I Gf von Waldeck in Waldeck. In: Genealogy.eu by Miroslav Marek.
 Waldeck. In: An Online Gotha, by Paul Theroff.

1613 births
1645 deaths
Philip 07, Count of Waldeck-Wildungen
German military officers
German people of the Thirty Years' War
Military personnel of the Thirty Years' War
17th-century German people
Military personnel from Hesse